Anthony Ross (born 19 December 1976) is an Australian former professional tennis player.

Ross, a Queensland native, played collegiate tennis for Pepperdine University in Malibu from 1997 to 2000. He earned All-American honours for doubles in 2000 when he and Sebastien Graeff teamed up to make the quarter-finals of the NCAA Division 1 Championships.

During his career on the professional tour, Ross made most progress as a doubles player, reaching a best ranking of 134 in the world. He was an ATP Tour quarter-finalist in the doubles of the 2001 Shanghai Open and won the doubles title at the Bangkok Challenger in 2002. At the 2003 Wimbledon Championships he featured in the main draw of the mixed doubles, as partner of Amanda Augustus.

Challenger titles

Doubles: (1)

References

External links
 
 

1976 births
Living people
Australian male tennis players
Pepperdine Waves men's tennis players
Tennis people from Queensland